Brigitte Zarie is a Canadian-born American singer, songwriter and composer.

Early years
Brigitte Zarie was born in Toronto, Ontario, Canada, of Moroccan Jewish parents originally from Casablanca, Morocco. Her mother was a singer and her father a soldier in the French Foreign Legion and a multi-instrumentalist. She grew up listening to Stan Getz and Frank Sinatra, and learned to play and sing with her ten siblings. She heard Bebop music for the first time when the family traveled to Buffalo, New York, U.S. and soon found her calling in music. She briefly attended The Royal Conservatory of Music in Toronto, but dropped out. Around 1995, she loaded her belongings into a U-Haul and moved to New York City, New York.

Music career
Zarie sings in English, French and Portuguese. In 2009, she released her first solo album, Make Room for Me, arranged and co-written by Neil Jason. Jazz Inside magazine called her "The next jazz sensation from Canada." Reviewing her second album L'amour in 2014, critic Christopher Zoukis of the Seattle Post-Intelligencer compared her to Nina Simone. The album debuted at No. 1 on the French Amazon Jazz and French iTunes Jazz charts.

Personal life
In 1998, she married the renowned session bass player Neil Jason.

Discography

Solo

References

External links
 
 
 

Living people
American women jazz singers
American jazz singers
American jazz composers
American Sephardic Jews
Canadian Sephardi Jews
Canadian people of Moroccan-Jewish descent
American people of Moroccan-Jewish descent
Women jazz composers
Canadian women jazz singers
Canadian jazz composers
Musicians from Toronto
Year of birth missing (living people)
Canadian women composers
21st-century American women
Jewish women singers